Paradise Island is an island in The Bahamas formerly known as Hog Island. The island, with an area of  (2.8 km2/1.1 sq mi), is located just off the shore of the city of Nassau, which is itself located on the northern edge of the island of New Providence. It is best known for the sprawling resort Atlantis with its extensive water park rides, pools, beach, restaurants, walk-in aquarium and casinos.

Paradise Island is connected to the island of New Providence by two bridges that cross Nassau Harbour.  The first was built in 1966 by Resorts International, and the second in the late 1990s.

Recent history

Paradise Island Airport
A small airstrip existed on the island from 1989 to 1999 to serve the resort. Prior to 1989 the airport was a seaplane base with a ramp for aircraft to leave the water. In 1989 a  runway was added to the airport.
The airport's codes were: IATA: PID  ICAO: MYPI. Both Paradise Island Airlines and Chalk's International Airlines were the main tenants of the airport. US Airways Express also served the airport from Fort Lauderdale-Hollywood International Airport.

The STOL capable de Havilland Canada DHC-7 Dash 7 turboprop operated by Paradise Island Airlines as well the Grumman G-73 Mallard amphibian aircraft flown by Chalk's International Airlines both served the airstrip which closed in 1999. The airfield  and runway have since been removed and replaced with an 18-hole luxury golf course surrounded by one of the wealthiest neighbourhoods on the island. The area goes by the name "Ocean Club" with property prices as high as 40 million dollars or more.

Purchase by Huntington Hartford and development as a resort
Huntington Hartford, the A&P supermarket heir, arrived on Hog Island in 1959. Hartford bought Hog Island from Axel Wenner-Gren and changed the name to Paradise Island.  He hired the Palm Beach architect John Volk and built the Ocean Club, Cafe Martinique, Hurricane Hole, the Golf Course, among other island landmarks. He also acquired and installed the Cloisters, a 14th-century French Augustinian monastery originally purchased in Montréjeau and dismantled by William Randolph Hearst in the 1920s. He hired Gary Player to be the golf pro and Pancho Gonzales to be the tennis pro. His opening of Paradise Island in 1962 was covered in Newsweek and Time magazines. He hired the staff from Hôtel du Cap-Eden-Roc to work off season at the Ocean Club.  He had the fireworks for the opening party flown in from the South of France. He had a flag and Paradise Beach was featured on Bahamian three-dollar notes in 1966 (introduced as a close equivalent to the Bahamian Pound, which was replaced at the rate of $1 = £7, so $3 = £21).

Development as a gambling resort
Huntington Hartford met James M. Crosby (1927–1986) through Huntington's bodyguard Sy Alter. Sy Alter met Jim Crosby at the Colony Club in Palm Beach. Huntington Hartford obtained the gambling licence for Paradise Island and included Jim Crosby as an extra investor. Jim Crosby and Jack Davis then formed a company, Resorts International, to continue developing Paradise Island. 

Paradise Island was purchased in the 1980s for $79 million, then sold to Merv Griffin for $400 million.  It was last sold for $125 million to the current owner, Sol Kerzner († March 2020).

Gallery

Climate

In popular culture

Films
 The Beatles' film Help! (1965) was partially filmed on Paradise Island.
 The film My Father the Hero (1994) was filmed at Paradise Island.
 Atlantis Paradise Island is prominent in the Mary-Kate and Ashley film Holiday in the Sun (2001).
 A larger part of the island is shown in the movie After the Sunset (2004).
 The James Bond films Thunderball (1965) and Casino Royale (2006) were partially shot on Paradise Island.
 The film The Other Woman (2014) features a section of Paradise Island's beach in the early morning.

Television
 The TV show My Wife and Kids filmed one of their episodes on Paradise Island.
 Survivor: All-Stars contestants Rob Mariano and Amber Brkich were married on Paradise Island in a two-hour TV special.
 The American Dad episode "Bahama Mama" is set in the Atlantis Resort on Paradise Island.

References

Bibliography

Further reading

External links 

Islands of the Bahamas
Nassau, Bahamas